The 2012 Kontinental Hockey League All-Star Game was the All-Star game for the 2011-12 season of the Kontinental Hockey League (KHL). It took place on 20 (Legends Game) and 21 (All-Star Game) January 2012 at the Arena Riga in Riga, Latvia.

Skills Competition Winners
 The Fastest Skater - Miķelis Rēdlihs
 Shootout Skill - Vladimir Tarasenko
 Goaltender Competition - Chris Holt
 Longest Shot - Dmitri Kalinin
 Puck Control Team Relay - Team Ozoliņš
 Shooting Accuracy - Sergei Mozyakin
 Hardest Shot - Alexander Riazantsev (183.67 km/h, which is considered as a new world record)
 Captains Duel - Sergei Fedorov
 Fastest Skater Team Relay - Team Fedorov

Rosters

Notes 

Geoff Platt was named to the Team Ozoliņš, but did not to play. Zbyněk Irgl was named as his replacement.
Vitali Koval was named to the Team Ozoliņš, but did not play. Chris Holt was named as his replacement.

See also
2011–12 KHL season
Kontinental Hockey League All-Star Game

References

External links
 Official homepage

KHL All-Star Game
KHL All-Star Game
2012
All Star Game
Ice hockey in Riga